The yellow-throated toucan (Ramphastos ambiguus) is a Near Threatened species of bird in the family Ramphastidae, the toucans, toucanets, and aracaris. It is found from Honduras south into northern South America and beyond to Peru.

Taxonomy and systematics

Three subspecies of yellow-throated toucan are recognized:

 "Chestnut-mandibled" toucan, R. a. swainsonii - (Gould, 1833)
 "Black-mandibled" toucan (in part), the nominate R. a. ambiguus - Swainson, 1823
 "Black-mandibled" toucan (in part), R. a. abbreviatus - Cabanis, 1862

All three subspecies were originally described as separate species. R. a. abbreviatus was relatively early reassigned as a subspecies of R. a. ambiguus. Subspecies R. a. swainsonii differs from ambiguus by 1.35% in mitochondrial DNA which led to its treatment as a species by major taxonomies until about 2010.

Description

The three subspecies differ little in their dimensions, though females' bills are shorter than males' in all three. Other measurements differ little by sex.

The yellow-throated toucan's subspecies have essentially the same plumage. They are mostly black, with a maroon tint to the hindneck and upper back and white uppertail coverts. Their face, throat, and upper breast are bright yellow with white and crimson bands below the breast. Their vent and undertail coverts are bright red. The bare skin around their eye does differ: sky blue in the nominate R. a. ambiguus, yellow green in R. a. abbreviatus, and varying between yellow and bright green in R. a. swainsonii. The three subspecies' bills differ as well. All have a mostly yellow maxilla with a greenish yellow stripe on the culmen and a thin black line at the base. The nominate and R. a. abbreviatus have black mandibles; R. a. swainsonii[{apostrophe]}} is maroon to reddish chestnut brown.

Distribution and habitat

The subspecies of yellow-throated toucan are found thus:

 R. a. swainsonii, from southeastern Honduras through Nicaragua, Costa Rica, Panama, and western Colombia to southwestern Ecuador
 R. a. ambiguus, from southwestern Colombia on the eastern slope of the Andes to south-central Peru
 R. a. abbreviatus, northeastern Colombia and northwestern and northern Venezuela

The "chestnut mandibled" R. a. swainsonii primarily inhabits lowland evergreen primary forest and also occurs in gallery forest, older secondary forest, and well-treed parks and gardens. It shuns dry forest and large open areas but can be found in plantations with fruiting trees that border forest. The two "black-mandibled" subspecies are usually found in the interior of humid primary montane forest but also occur at its edges and clearings and in older secondary forest.

Behavior

Movement

As far as is known the yellow-throated toucan is a year-round resident throughout its range.

Feeding

Most of the data on the yellow-throated toucan's diet and foraging behavior are from studies of the wide-ranging R. a. swainsonii. It is primarily a fruit eater, with small amounts of animal matter such as insects and other arthropods, small lizards, and the eggs and young of other birds. Most of the animal matter is apparently fed to nestlings. The species forages mainly in the forest canopy, singly, in pairs, or in small groups, but also retrieves fallen fruit from the ground. They take fruit by hopping from branch to branch and may hang upside down to reach it. Though the species is not territorial, individuals often defend a single fruiting tree.

Breeding

The yellow-throated toucan's breeding season varies latitudinally, from March to June in Costa Rica, January to July in Panama and Colombia, and between December and May in Ecuador. Males allopreen and courtship-feed females. The species nests in tree cavities formed by rot; they may enlarge it but cannot truly excavate. The clutch size is thought to be two or three eggs. The incubation period and time to fledging are not known. Both parents defend the nest and care for young.

Vocal and non-vocal sounds

The yellow-throated toucan's primary vocalization is "a series of loud, far-carrying yelps." The call is somewhat variable in tempo and the number of notes. It has been transcribed as "Díos te dé te dé", which translates from Spanish as "God give you". The species calls year round, usually from the tops of trees, and especially near dawn and dusk. It also "grunts, croaks, and rattles loudly in aggressive displays." In flight its wings rustle due to notches in the two outer primaries.

Status

The IUCN has assessed the yellow-throated toucan as Near Threatened. It has a very large range, but its population size is not known and is believed to be decreasing. The major threat is continuing conversion of its forest habitat to agriculture and ranching; hunting is also a threat. "Yellow-throated Toucan is able to tolerate some human disturbance and forest alteration, but is nonetheless affected greatly by habitat loss."

References

External links
Bibliography of online, ornithological articles which explore the natural history of the black-mandibled toucan, Ramphastos ambiguus ambiguus.
 

yellow-throated toucan
Birds of Nicaragua
Birds of Costa Rica
Birds of Panama
Birds of Colombia
Birds of Ecuador
Birds of the Peruvian Andes
Birds of the Venezuelan Andes
yellow-throated toucan